The Legend in Mining award is presented annually to individuals who have made notable contributions to the resources sector in Australia.

The award recipients are determined by the editors of Resource Stocks magazine, a London-based industry publication.

Recipients 

Past recipients of the award include:

 Nev Power, CEO of Fortescue Metals Group (2017)

 Mark Bennett, Sirius (2014)
 Paul Heithersay, Government of South Australia (2013)
 David Moore, Mincor Resources (2012)
 Paul Holloway, Government of South Australia (2008)
 Ian Burston (2008)
 Gavin Thomas (2005)
 Robert Champion de Crespigny
 Ian Plimer
 John Collier
 Ron Manners
 Trevor Sykes
 Roy Woodall
 Owen Hegarty
 Andrew Forrest, Fortescue Metals

References 

Business and industry awards
Mining in Australia
Mining culture and traditions